Tim Blackman is a British academic. He is the current Vice-Chancellor of the Open University, serving since October 2019. He previously served as the Vice-Chancellor of Middlesex University from 2015–2019.

After graduating with a degree in geography from Durham University, Blackman started his career as a community worker in Belfast, before completing a PhD in urban sociology.

He served as the head of the School of Applied Social Sciences and director of the Wolfson Research Institute.

He served as deputy dean of the Faculty of Social Sciences at the Oxford Brookes University, and was also dean of social sciences and at Teesside University.

Blackman, a fellow of Academy of Social Sciences and Royal Society of Arts. He serves as assessor of Social Policy and Social Work in the England Research Excellence Framework. He is a founding member of the Community Technical Aid and the Oxford Dementia Centre.

References 

Academics of Middlesex University
Writers from Belfast
British sociologists
Living people
Alumni of Hatfield College, Durham
Year of birth missing (living people)